This is a list of parks in Nelson City at the top of New Zealand's South Island.

See also
List of marae in Nelson, New Zealand
List of schools in Nelson, New Zealand

References

Nelson City

Nelson